The Granadino Pouter is a breed of fancy pigeon developed over many years of selective breeding. Granadino Pouters, along with other varieties of domesticated pigeons, are all descendants of the rock dove (Columba livia).

See also 

Gaditano Pouter
List of pigeon breeds

References

Pigeon breeds